"In the Year 2525 (Exordium & Terminus)" is a 1969 hit song by the American pop-rock duo of Zager and Evans. It reached number one on the Billboard Hot 100 for six weeks commencing July 12, 1969. It peaked at number one in the UK Singles Chart for three weeks in August and September that year. The song was written and composed by Rick Evans in 1964 and originally released on a small regional record label (Truth Records) in 1968. It was later picked up by RCA Records. Zager and Evans disbanded in 1971.

Zager and Evans were a one-hit wonder, never releasing another charting single. Their follow-up single on RCA Victor, "Mr. Turnkey", reached number 48 in the Canadian pop charts and number 41 in the Canadian AC chart. Another single, "Listen to the People", managed to make the bottom slot of the Cashbox chart at number 100 and number 96 in Canada.

Summary
"In the Year 2525" opens with an introductory verse explaining that if mankind has survived to that point, they would witness the subsequent events in the song. The following verses jump the story approximately with 1000-year intervals, specifically 3535, 4545, 5555, 6565, 7510, 8510 and finally 9595. In each succeeding millennium, life becomes increasingly sedentary and automated: thoughts are pre-programmed into pills for people to consume, eyes, teeth, and limbs all lose their purposes due to machines replacing their functions, and marriage becomes obsolete because children are conceived in test tubes.

The song ends after 10,000 years. By that time, humans have finally become extinct. But the narrator notes that somewhere 'so very far away', possibly in an alternative universe, the scenarios told in the song have still yet to play out, as the song repeats from the top (but in the same key, tone, and speed as the previous verse) and the recording fades out.

The overriding theme, of a world doomed by its passive acquiescence to and over dependence on its own overdone technologies, struck a resonant chord in millions of people around the world in the late 1960s.

Recording
The song was recorded primarily in one take in 1968, at a studio in a cow pasture in Odessa, Texas.

Personnel
Denny Zager & Rick Evansacoustic guitars & vocals
Mark Daltonbass guitar
Dave Truppdrums
The Odessa Symphonyadditional instruments
Tommy Allsupproducer

The record had regional success so RCA Records picked it up for a national release. RCA producer Ethel Gabriel was tasked with enhancing the sound and arrangement. The track went to number 1 on the U.S. charts within three weeks of release.

Legacy
The song has been covered at least 60 times in seven languages, including a Jewish parody recorded by Country Yossi, and an Italian version recorded by Zager and Evans called "Nell'Anno 2033". 

It was included in a Clear Channel memorandum, distributed by Clear Channel Communications to every radio station owned by the company, which contained 165 songs considered to be "lyrically questionable" following the September 11, 2001, attacks.

Two lines of the song are sung by the inmate Murphy in the 1992 FILM Alien 3 immediately prior to his death. Brief snippets are played in "The Time Is Now", the second-season finale of the TV show Millennium, which depicts an apocalyptic event. The song was rewritten and used as the introductory theme for the 2000 TV series Cleopatra 2525. In 2010, it was parodied as "In the Year 252525" in the seventh episode of Futurama'''s sixth season, "The Late Philip J. Fry", as Fry, Professor Farnsworth and Bender travel forwards through time to find a period in which the backwards time machine has been invented. The song acts as an aesthetic theme to the film Gentlemen Broncos. The BBC Radio series 2525, a sketch show set in the year 2525, featured a cover of the song with its first lyric as its introductory theme.

The first few verses of the song are used as the opening theme while the credits roll in the 2006 film Tunnel Rats''.

Chart history

Weekly charts

Year-end charts

All-time charts

See also
 26th century
 Brave New World
 Dystopia
 Human extinction
 Human impact on the environment
 Anthropocene
 List of one-hit wonders in the United Kingdom
 List of one-hit wonders in the United States

References

External links
 

1964 songs
1968 debut singles
1969 singles
American folk rock songs
American psychedelic rock songs
Billboard Hot 100 number-one singles
Cashbox number-one singles
UK Singles Chart number-one singles
Number-one singles in Germany
Number-one singles in Switzerland
Number-one singles in Australia
Number-one singles in New Zealand
Number-one singles in Norway
Irish Singles Chart number-one singles
Oricon International Singles Chart number-one singles
Psychedelic folk songs
RPM Top Singles number-one singles
Dystopian music
Environmental songs
Fiction set in the 26th century
Novelty songs
Science fiction music
RCA Victor singles